The Album is the debut album by German recording artist Daniel Schuhmacher, the winner of the sixth season of Deutschland Sucht Den Superstar, the German version of American Idol. It was released by Sony Music on 19 June 2009. Entirely produced by DSDS judge Dieter Bohlen's Dreamfactory, the album contains two cover versions which were already performed by Schuhmacher during the DSDS shows, including "Sweet Dreams (Are Made of This)" by Eurythmics and "Ain't No Sunshine" by Bill Withers.

Chart performance
The Album debuted at number one on German Albums Chart, the fifth DSDS winner to do so. It was eventually certified gold by the Bundesverband Musikindustrie (BVMI), selling 137,000 within the first nine months of its release.

Track listing

Charts

Weekly charts

Year-end charts

Certifications

References

External links
  
 

2009 debut albums
Daniel Schuhmacher albums
Sony Music albums